The 1994–95 Belarusian Cup was the fourth season of the annual Belarusian football cup competition. It began on 3 August 1994 with the preliminary round and ended on 28 June 1995 with the final at the Dinamo Stadium in Minsk.

FC Dinamo Minsk were the defending champions, having defeated FC Fandok Bobruisk in the 1994 final, but were knocked out in the third round by FC Molodechno, the eventual finalists.

FC Dinamo-93 Minsk won the final against FC Torpedo Mogilev after the penalty shootout to win their first title.

Preliminary round
The games were played on 3 August 1994.

|}

Round of 32
The games were played on 31 August 1994.

|}

Round of 16
The games were played on 21 September 1994.

|}

Quarterfinals
The games were played on 4 and 5 October 1994.

|}

Semifinals
The games were played on 26 October 1994.

|}

Final
The final match was played on 28 June 1995 at the Dinamo Stadium in Minsk.

External links
 RSSSF

Belarusian Cup seasons
Belarusian Cup
Cup
Cup